Engineering information management (EIM) is the business function within product development and specifically systems engineering that allows engineers to collaborate on a single source of truth of engineering data.

Contrary to product data management (PDM) and product lifecycle management (PLM), its main purpose is not storage of CAD-related drawings and files, but rather the full execution of the V-model for hardware development, complementing and integrating to the above mentioned systems.

Scope 
EIM systems enable collaboration on all important aspects of the engineering lifecycle, such as: 

 Requirements management
 Functional design
 Product architecture
 Detailed systems design and simulation 
 Verification and validation 
 Documentation 

EIM systems implement the activities on both sides of the engineering V-model. Instead of being purely a data storage, it focuses also on the human interaction with the models and data, thus enabling concurrent engineering.  

EIM therefore enables the optimization of products and engineering processes, where traditional methodologies have become ineffective in keeping up with rising product and process complexity.

Interactions with the other engineering management systems 
EIM systems do directly and indirectly interact with other tools in the engineering information infrastructure, such as:
 Computer simulation tools
 Automated hardware testing tools
 Product lifecycle and product data management systems
 Enterprise resource planning tools
 Manufacturing execution systems
 Computer-aided design (MCAD) and electronic design automation (ECAD) tools

References 

Product development
Systems engineering
Information management